State Route 133 (SR 133) is an  southeast-to-northwest state highway in the southwestern part of the U.S. state of Georgia. It travels through portions of Lowndes, Brooks, Colquitt, Worth, Dougherty, and Lee counties. It connects the Valdosta and Albany areas.

Route description
SR 133 begins at an intersection with US 84/US 221/SR 38/SR 94 (West Hill Avenue) in Valdosta, within Lowndes County. It has an interchange with Interstate 75 (I-75) before passing through Troupville and crossing over the Withlacoochee and Little rivers, the latter one marksing the Lowndes–Brooks county line. It heads northwest to Morven and an intersection with SR 76. It continues northwest to SR 122 and SR 333 (Moultrie Road). A short distance later, it enters Colquitt County. The road passes through the town of Berlin, and past the Spence Airport, before it reaches Moultrie. In town, it first meets US 319/SR 35 (East Bypass) and SR 37 (1st Avenue SE). SR 37/SR 133 join the concurrency to the north. A short distance later, SR 37 departs to the northeast The concurrency curves to the northwest to meet the northern terminus of US 319 Business. At this intersection, US 319/SR 35 depart to the northeast, while SR 33 (which runs concurrent with US 319 Business) joins SR 133 to the northwest. The highways split, and SR 133 travels through rural areas of the county until it reaches Doerun. In town, it has an intersection with SR 270 Spur (East Bay Street). Less than  later, it joins SR 270 in a concurrency to the west. At North Broad Street, the highways split, with SR 133 continuing to head west. Northwest of Doerun, the road enters Worth County. It travels through rural areas of the county, before it crosses into Dougherty County. It continues to the northwest until it enter Albany. In Albany, it has an interchange with US 19/SR 3/SR 300 (Liberty Expressway). This interchange marks the eastern terminus of SR 234 (Moultrie Road). US 19/SR 3/SR 133/SR 300 head north on the Liberty Expressway. They meet US 82 Business/SR 520 Business (East Oglethorpe Boulevard). This interchange also marks the southern terminus of US 19 Business. Less than  later, SR 300 leaves the concurrency, and US 82/SR 520 (Clark Avenue) join it. The concurrency curves to the northwest and crosses over the Flint River. The next interchange is SR 91 (North Jefferson Street), where SR 133 departs the concurrency. Almost immediately, SR 91 (Philema Road) leaves to the northeast, and SR 133 continues to the northwest. It crosses over the western part of Lake Worth. Almost immediately the highway enters Lee County. Finally, it continues northwest for a little while until it meets its northern terminus, an intersection with US 19/SR 3 (Walnut Street), north of Albany.

All of SR 133 from its southern terminus in Valdosta until the point it leaves the Liberty Expressway in Albany is part of the National Highway System, a system of roadways important to the nation's economy, defense, and mobility.

Future

Urban stretches of SR 133 are four-laned and undivided. Rural stretches of the route are currently two-laned. The GDOT has plans to widen all rural stretches of SR 133 by 2018.

Major intersections

Related route

State Route 133 Alternate (SR 133 Alt.) is a  alternate route that exists entirely within the central part of Colquitt County. It is known as Old Doerun Road for its entire length.

It begins at an intersection with US 319 Business/SR 33 (North Main Street) in downtown Moultrie. It heads west and curves to the northwest to meet SR 111 (West Bypass) in the northwest part of the city. The highway travels through rural areas until it meets the SR 133 mainline in a rural part of Colquitt County, northwest of Moultrie.

SR 133 Alt. is not part of the National Highway System, a system of roadways important to the nation's economy, defense, and mobility.

See also

References

External links

 
 Georgia Roads (Routes 121 - 140)

133
Transportation in Lowndes County, Georgia
Transportation in Brooks County, Georgia
Transportation in Colquitt County, Georgia
Transportation in Worth County, Georgia
Transportation in Dougherty County, Georgia
Transportation in Lee County, Georgia